Dinema is a genus of orchids. It is represented by a single currently accepted species, Dinema polybulbon, native to Mexico, Central America, and the Caribbean.

Description
They are epiphytes or lithophytes; with pseudobulbs 10 mm long and 6 mm wide, spaced 1–1.5 cm apart on the creeping rhizome, slightly compressed, yellowish-green, apically bi-foliate. The leaves are 15 mm long and 8 mm wide, obtuse, emarginate, shiny green. The inflorescence is uniflora or rarely with 2 flowers, terminal, the flowers 15 mm in diameter, the sepals and the petals are yellowish-brown, the lip is white to yellowish-white with the yellow nail, the column is white with purple spots; the sepals 9 mm long and 2 mm wide, shortly acuminate; petals 9 mm long and 1.5 mm wide; the simple lip, 9 mm long and 6 mm wide, unguiculate, adnate to the base of the spine, with the disc dilated and with undulated edges, thickened nail 2 mm wide; the column is 5 mm long, with 2 conspicuous extensions at the apex, the anther is terminal, pollinia 4; ovary 15 mm long, pedicellate. The fruits are ellipsoid capsules

Distribution
It is found in Mexico,   Belize, El Salvador, Guatemala, Honduras, Nicaragua, Cuba and Jamaica. Uncommon species in habitat, found in humid mixed forests, at an altitude of 1000–1400 meters; it blooms in November, and bears fruit in August.

Taxonomy

This species can be recognized by the small size, the relatively large solitary flowers, the simple white to yellowish-white lip, and the cornicle-shaped extensions of the column. It is a monotypic genus.

Dinema polybulbon was described by (Sw.) Lindl. and published in The Genera and Species of Orchidaceous Plants 111. 1831

Synonyms
Epidendrum polybulbon 
Encyclia polybulbon 
Bulbophyllum occidentale 
Epidendrum polybulbon var. luteoalbum 
Epidendrum cubincola 
Dinema cubincola

References

External links 

Monotypic Epidendroideae genera
Laeliinae genera
Orchids of Mexico
Orchids of Central America
Orchids of Belize
Flora of the Caribbean
Laeliinae
Flora without expected TNC conservation status